"Where You Are (Sávežan)" is a song by Jon Henrik Fjällgren and Arc North featuring Adam Woods, released as a single on 25 February 2023. It was performed in Melodifestivalen 2023.

Charts

References

2023 songs
2023 singles
Melodifestivalen songs of 2023